The 2010 KNSB Dutch Allround Championships in speed skating were held at the Thialf ice stadium in Heerenveen, Netherlands on 6 and 7 March 2010. The championships were part of the 2009-2010 speed skating season.

The men's and women's winners, Wouter olde Heuvel and Elma de Vries qualified for the 2010 World Allround Speed Skating Championships. Title holders Sven Kramer and Ireen Wüst didn't compete in the championships. They were already selected to compete at the World Allround Championships, besides of Jan Blokhuijsen and Diane Valkenburg, who also didn't compete at the Dutch Allround Championships. Topsportcommissie Langebaan selected the final two athletes for the World Allround Championships, after the Dutch Allround Championships.

Schedule

Medalists

Allround

Distance

Men's results

Final results

 NR = not ranked
 DNS = did not start
 DQ = disqualified
 pr = personal record

Source: Schaatsstatistieken.nl  & Schaatsupdate.nl: 500m, 5000m, 1500m, 10,000m,

Women's results

Final results

 NR = not ranked
 DQ = disqualified
 pr = personal record

Source: Schaatsstatistieken.nl  & Schaatsupdate.nl: 500m, 3000m, 1500m, 5000m

References

KNSB Dutch Allround Championships
KNSB Dutch Allround Championships
2010 Allround
KNSB Dutch Allround Championships, 2010